The Savage Woman refers to:

 The Savage Woman (1918 film), American film
 The Savage Woman (1991 film), Canadian film